Charlie Ian Gilmour (born 11 February 1999) is a Scottish professional footballer who plays as a defensive midfielder for St Johnstone.

Club career
Born in Brighton, Gilmour was spotted by Arsenal scouts at the age of 6. On 29 November 2018, he made his first team debut, playing the last 14 minutes in a 3–0 win over Vorskla Poltava in the Europa League. Gilmour was released by Arsenal on 7 June 2019, after spending 14 years at the club.

A day later, on 8 July 2019, Gilmour signed with Norwich City on a two-year deal. On 18 July 2019, he signed for Dutch side Telstar on a season-long loan.

On 1 February 2021, Gilmour signed a short-term deal with Scottish Premiership side St Johnstone until the end of the season. On 21 May 2021, he signed a new two-year contract with St Johnstone.

International career
Gilmour has represented both England and Scotland at youth international level. In 2013 and 2014, he represented Scotland at under-15 and under-16 level but then in 2015, he represented England Under-17 in the FA International Tournament. He has since returned to action for Scotland, playing at under-17 and under-19 level.

Career statistics

Honours
St Johnstone
Scottish Cup: 2020–21
Scottish League Cup: 2020–21

References

Living people
1999 births
Footballers from Brighton
Scottish footballers
Scotland youth international footballers
English footballers
England youth international footballers
Arsenal F.C. players
Association football midfielders
English people of Scottish descent
Norwich City F.C. players
SC Telstar players
Eerste Divisie players
St Johnstone F.C. players
Scottish Professional Football League players
Cove Rangers F.C. players